Franz Aloys Theodor Commer (23 January 1813 in Cologne – 17 August 1887 in Berlin) was a German church musician and music researcher.

Compositions 
 Choir for The Frogs by Aristophanes 1842
 Preußens Fest-Herolde. Eine Cantate zum 15ten Oktober 1844, for male choirs and orchestra
 Der Zauberring, after a poem by Anton Wilhelm von Zuccalmaglio, for male choirs and orchestra, 1844

Further reading 
 L. B. (Ludwig Bischoff), Franz Commer, in Niederrheinische Musikzeitung, Jg. 8, Nr. 18 vom 28. April 1860,  and Nr. 19 dated 5 May 1860,  (Numerized)
 
 Harald Kümmerling, Franz Commers Abschriften älterer Musikwerke, Cologne 1973 (Beiträge zur rheinischen Musikgeschichte, vol. 100)
 Briefwechsel Robert und Clara Schumanns mit Korrespondenten in Berlin 1832 bis 1883. edited by Klaus Martin Kopitz, Eva Katharina Klein and Thomas Synofzik (Schumann-Briefedition, series II, vol. 17), Cologne: Dohr 2015,

References

External links 
 
 
 Deutsche Biographie
 

1813 births
1887 deaths
German composers
19th-century German musicologists
Musicians from Cologne